Saint-Saëns' Cello Concerto No. 2 in D minor, Op. 119, is written in two movements, like his Fourth Piano Concerto. It was composed in 1902 and is dedicated to the Dutch cellist, Joseph Hollman, who gave the first performance on February 5, 1905 in Paris. The Second Concerto is much more virtuosic than the First, but does not possess the thematic inventiveness and harmonic intricacy of the First.

"In many respects, it's a finer creation than its famous predecessor in A minor Op. 33; larger in overall concept (it comprises two main sections, each subdivided into two movements) and arguably of greater thematic nobility, the concerto remains largely unknown."

Music 

Allegro moderato e maestoso - Andante sostenuto
Allegro non troppo - Cadenza - Molto allegro

The first part of the first movement is in ternary form. The second part is a prayer, in E-flat major, also in ternary form. The first movement ends with a scale in artificial harmonics, like the scale in the First Cello Concerto. The second movement is a moto perpetuo in G minor. It ends abruptly in a cadenza, followed by a major-key recapitulation of the first movement, and a coda.

Along with the solo cello, the concerto is scored for an orchestra consisting of 2 flutes, 2 oboes, 2 clarinets, 2 bassoons, 4 horns, 2 trumpets, timpani and strings.

Recordings 

Lynn Harrell (Cello) and Riccardo Chailly (Radio-Symphonie-Orchester-Berlin). CD Decca 1986
Steven Isserlis (Cello) and  Michael Tilson Thomas (London Symphony Orchestra). CD RCA Victor 1993 
Maria Kliegel (Cello) and Jean-François Monnard (Bournemouth Sinfonietta). CD Naxos 1995
Torleif Thedéen (Cello) and Jean-Jacques Kantorow (Tapiola Sinfonietta). CD Bis Records 1998
Steven Isserlis (Cello) and Christoph Eschenbach (NDR-Sinfonieorchester). CD RCA Victor 1999
Jeremy Findlay (Cello) and Jose Maria Florencio Junior (Poznan Philharmonic Orchestra). CD DUX 2003
Zuill Bailey (Cello) and David Wiley (Roanoke Symphony Orchestra) & Cello Concerto n°1. CD Delos International 2005
Jamie Walton (Cello) and Alex Briger (Philharmonia Orchestra), (with cello concerto n°1). CD Quartz 2006
Johannes Moser (Cello) and Fabrice Bollon (Radio-Sinfonieorchester Stuttgart des SWR). CD Hänssler Classic 2008
Piovano Luigi (cello) and Orchestra del Teatro Marrucino, conducted by Piero Bellugi, (Integral Cello Work)). 2 CD Eloquens 2011
Laszlo Varga (Cello) and Reinhard Peters (Westphalian Symphony Orchestra). 2 CD Vox 2014 
Christine Walevska (Cello) and Eliahu Inbal (Orchestra National de Monte-Carlo), (with Cello concerto n°1). CD Decca Eloquence 2016

Truls Mørk (Cello) and Neeme Järvi (Bergen Philharmonic Orchestra) (with Concerto n°1). CD Chandos 2016

References

Sources

External links

Concertos by Camille Saint-Saëns
Saint-Saens 2
1902 compositions
Compositions in D minor